Dancemania 10 is the tenth set in the Dancemania series of dance music compilation albums, released in 1998 by EMI Music Japan.

The album debuted at #13 on Oricon's weekly album chart, reached #9 the next week, and appeared on the yearly best-selling album chart at #84 in 1998 with 254,870 copies sold, along with another Dancemania album, Extra, which ranked #79.

With one of its 25 tracks "Butterfly", the album featured Smile.dk's first appearance on the series.


Tracks

Further details

The album's full length is 76:00.
The longest track is "Have You Never Been Mellow" (#3) at 4:11.
The shortest track is "Moon" (#23) at 2:12.
The album's overall average tempo is 137 bpm;
The fastest track is "Everything Counts" (#25) at 166 bpm.
The slowest track is "Love Dot Com." (#6) at 125 bpm.
The album contains 2 cover songs.
#3 "Have You Never Been Mellow" is a cover of Olivia Newton-John's Have You Never Been Mellow.
#8 "Boggie Nights" is a cover of Heatwave's "Boogie Nights".
The non-stop mixing was done by two members of the DJ team MST; Kohtaroh Chuganji and Mitsugu Matsumoto.

Several tracks on the album, including different remixes, can also be found on other Dancemania albums such as Delux 3, Extra, EX 6, Diamond, Diamond Complete Edition, Best Red, Happy Paradise, Fura Mania, Zip Mania II, Zip Mania III, Zip Mania Best, Bass #6, Bass #9, Club The Earth II, Speed 2, Speed 4, Speed 6, Speed Best 2001 or Speed G.

References

10
1998 compilation albums
Dance music compilation albums